Saint Vincent College is a private Benedictine college in Latrobe, Pennsylvania. Founded in 1846 by Boniface Wimmer, a monk from Bavaria, it is operated by the Benedictine monks of Saint Vincent Archabbey, the first Benedictine monastery in the United States, which was also founded by Wimmer.

History
Saint Vincent Archabbey and College was founded in 1846 by Boniface Wimmer, a monk from Metten Abbey in Bavaria. On April 18, 1870, the Pennsylvania state legislature incorporated the school. Saint Vincent College became coeducational in 1983. In 1996, the college, along with the archabbey, seminary, and parish, observed the 150th anniversary of its founding.

Presidents
The current president of the college is Fr. Paul R. Taylor, O.S.B., Ph.D. He was announced as the 18th president of Saint Vincent College on June 14, 2019, in a press conference at Heinz Field in Pittsburgh, while his official tenure began on July 1, 2019. Fr. Paul had previously served as the college's executive vice president from 2012 to 2019, while also having worked as vice president of institutional advancement and director of financial aid and admissions.

Father Paul succeeded Brother Norman W. Hipps, O.S.B., who served as the 17th president of Saint Vincent College from 2010 to 2019.

Previous presidents of the college are:
 Rt. Rev. Boniface Wimmer, O.S.B. (1871–1887)
 Rt. Rev. Andrew Hintenach, O.S.B. (1887–1892)
 Rt. Rev. Leander Schnerr, O.S.B. (1892–1920)
 Rt. Rev. Aurelius Stehle, O.S.B. (1920–1930)
 Rt. Rev. Alfred Koch, O.S.B. (1930–1950)
 Rt. Rev. Denis Strittmatter, O.S.B. (1950–1955)
 Rev. Quentin Schaut, O.S.B. (1955–1962)
 Rev. Maximilian Duman, O.S.B. (1962–1963)
 Rev. Maynard Brennan, O.S.B. (1963–1968)
 Rev. Fintan R. Shoniker, O.S.B. (1968–1971)
 Rev. Cecil G. Diethrich, O.S.B. (1971–1982)
 Rev. Augustine Flood, O.S.B. (1982–1985)
 Rev. John F. Murtha, O.S.B. (1985–1995)
 Rev. Martin R. Bartel, O.S.B. (1995–2000)
 James F. Will (2000–2006)
 Jim Towey (2006–2010)
 Br. Norman W. Hipps, O.S.B., Ph.D. (2010–19)
Rev. Paul R. Taylor, O.S.B, Ph.D. (2019-)

Academics
 
Saint Vincent is organized into four schools; each includes a number of departments and major and minor programs offering undergraduate or graduate degrees, as well as special programs and public service outreach activities. Each school has its own Dean who works closely with students, faculty and prospective students and a Council of Advisors composed of representatives of business, industry, and academia to advise and direct policy and programs.

Alex G. McKenna School of Business, Economics, and Government
This school was formed in 2001. It includes the departments of Business; Criminology, Law and Society and Politics and Public Affairs. The school's majors include Accounting; Business Education; Criminology, Law and Society; Economics; Entrepreneurship; Finance; International Business; Management; Marketing; Politics and Political Science; and Public Policy. The McKenna School also includes master's programs in Criminology and Management: Operational Excellence.

School of Social Sciences, Communication, and Education
The school was formed in 2004. It includes the departments of Communication, Criminology, Education, Psychology, and Sociology/Anthropology. Associated with the school are the Saint Vincent College Drug and Alcohol Prevention Projects and the Fred M. Rogers Center for Early Learning and Children's Media.

School of Humanities and Fine Arts
The school was formed in 2004. It contains the departments and programs of English, Fine Arts (Art and Music), History, Liberal Arts, Modern and Classical Languages, Philosophy, and Theology. The Saint Vincent Gallery and the college's Stage and Theatre programs are part of this school, in addition to numerous student music ensembles including The Saint Vincent College Singers, The March of the Bearcats Marching Band, as well as Pep Band, Concert Band, Jazz Band, and Percussion Ensemble.

The Herbert W. Boyer School of Natural Science, Mathematics, and Computing
The school was formed in 2004 and includes the departments of Biology, Chemistry, Computing and Information Science, Engineering, Mathematics, and Physics. Majors are also offered in Biochemistry, Bioinformatics, and Environmental Science. Teacher certification may be obtained in biology, chemistry, environmental education, mathematics and physics. Cooperative programs with other institutions of higher education enable students to pursue degrees in specific engineering fields, actuarial science, nursing, occupational therapy, pharmacy, physical therapy and physician assistant.

In addition to its own general engineering degree, the college offers a five-year cooperative liberal arts and engineering program. Students spend three years at St. Vincent, fulfilling core requirements and prerequisites for an engineering major, then two years at the engineering college. Upon completion of this coursework students are guaranteed acceptance at Penn State University, the University of Pittsburgh and The Catholic University of America. Under this program, the student receives a Bachelor of Arts degree from St. Vincent and a Bachelor of Science degree from the engineering college.

In 2019 the college entered an agreement with Carlow University to offer a degree in Nursing on Saint Vincent's campus.  Students in this program remain enrolled at Saint Vincent for two years, and then transfer to Carlow for the remaining two years of nursing courses and students ultimately receive a Carlow nursing degree.  However, all courses and labs are administered at Saint Vincent and students remain in Latrobe throughout their degree.

Athletics
St. Vincent has intercollegiate teams, known as Bearcats, in women's bowling, football, baseball, softball, volleyball, basketball, cross country, golf, lacrosse, soccer, swimming, track and tennis. The college is a member of the National Collegiate Athletic Association (NCAA). Almost all teams compete in the NCAA Division III Presidents' Athletic Conference (PAC). Two sports that are not sponsored by the PAC have other affiliations. In bowling, a sport with a single championship for all three NCAA divisions, the Bearcats compete in the Allegheny Mountain Collegiate Conference (AMCC). The newest varsity sport of men's volleyball, introduced for the 2020 season (2019–20 school year), is playing its first season as a Division III independent until joining the AMCC for the 2021 season and beyond. The school also offers men's ice hockey and men's and women's rugby as club sports. The college also has an equestrian team that competes in the Intercollegiate Horse Show Association. One Saint Vincent basketball player, Daniel Santiago, has played in the NBA.

The athletic colors are green and gold.

Pittsburgh Steelers training camp
Since 1966, the college has served as the training camp host of the Pittsburgh Steelers. Rooney Hall, completed in 1995, is a residence hall which is used by the Steelers during their stay on campus each summer. It is named in honor of the Steelers' founder, Arthur J. Rooney Sr.

The site of camp, Chuck Noll Field, is one of the most storied in the NFL and NCAA with Peter King of SI.com describing it as: ". . .  I love the place. It's the perfect training-camp setting, looking out over the rolling hills of the Laurel Highlands in west-central Pennsylvania, an hour east of Pittsburgh. On a misty or foggy morning, standing atop the hill at the college, you feel like you're in Scotland.  Classic, wonderful slice of Americana. If you can visit one training camp, this is the one to see."''

Other sports
The main athletic center is the Robert S. Carey Student Center. It was formerly known as Sportsman's Hall, after the original name of St. Vincent Parish, and Kennedy Hall, after President John F. Kennedy, who received an honorary degree of law on February 4, 1958. It contains the gymnasium, swimming pool, student union and fitness center.

In 2011, the Bearcat basketball team, led by All-American Brittany Sedlock, became the first team in school history to qualify for the NCAA Division-III postseason since the school made the move from the NAIA.  Ranked among the top-20 nationally throughout the season, the Bearcats were defeated in their opening-round National Tournament game by Greensboro College. The women's basketball team overcame a major tragedy during the 2010–11 season with the Christmas Day 2010 death of Kristen Zawacki (1958-2010), the lone women's basketball coach in the program's 25-year history. Zawacki, also the school's associate athletic director, won over 500 games in her career. She was succeeded by assistant coach Jimmy Petruska, who was named interim coach immediately following her death, before being officially named the team's head coach on April 27, 2011. During his eight-year tenure, Petruska's teams have qualified for the NCAA Division III playoffs three times, highlighted by a 2018–19 season in which the Bearcats finished 23-5 overall and 15–1 in conference to earn their first PAC title.

In 2016, the Saint Vincent men's basketball team earned their fourth straight Presidents' Athletic Conference Tournament Championship by defeating Thomas More College 65–62 to advance to the NCAA National Tournament and advancing to the NCAA Tournament for the fourth straight season.

On June 27, 2017, the school named Brian Niemiec the head coach of the men's tennis team. In doing so, Niemiec became what is thought to be the youngest head coach of an NCAA team at the age of 21 years, 10 months, and 9 days.

The Saint Vincent women's lacrosse team, coached by Jym Walters, boasts the top scorer in NCAA Division III history. As a senior in 2018, Maggie Nelson set Division III records with 141 goals and 178 points. During her senior campaign, Nelson scored 10 or more goals in 11 different games, while her 19 points (11 goals, 8 assists) in an April 11 win over Chatham University were also the most in a single game in NCAA D-III history. Nelson was featured in Sports Illustrated's "Faces in the Crowd" on May 18, 2018. At the conclusion of the 2019 season, Nelson's 496 career points rank second all-time in NCAA Division III history.

Controversies

Jim Towey

During Jim Towey's four-year tenure as president, he stressed a more traditional Catholic identity. Towey attracted two high-profile commencement speakers: U.S. President George W. Bush in 2007 and Mike Tomlin, coach of the Pittsburgh Steelers in 2008. During this same time Towey encountered opposition from some of the faculty. While Towey attributed much of the dissension to his lack of experience in academia and to faculty unaccustomed to rapid change, in 2008 three-quarters of the school's tenured faculty signed a letter stating that several decisions made by Towey had caused a major crisis at the college. More than two years later, Towey left Saint Vincent College; he was named president of Ave Maria University in July 2011.

Mark Gruber 

In November 2009 Mark Gruber, a Benedictine priest and faculty member who opposed Towey's reforms, was accused by the college administration of sexual misconduct. Gruber admitted under oath that he created pornographic materials on a college computer and e-mailed the images. On July 2, 2012, Catholic Church officials confirmed that "Gruber has been found guilty of the delicts (canonical crimes) of possession of child pornography; production of materials which gravely injure good morals; abuse of the Sacrament of Confession (but not a violation of the sacramental seal); and defamation of a legitimate superior." In July 2013 he was relieved of his monastic and priestly duties.

Alcuin Hall renaming 
In 2018, Saint Vincent renamed a building on campus, after sexual abuse allegations were revealed about an early dean of the college. The former Alcuin Hall was renamed as the Student Activity Center. The name changed after the St. Vincent Archabbey released a list on August 16, 2018, of a dozen Benedictines against whom credible allegations of sexual abuse had been made. That list included the Rev. Alcuin Tasch, whom the building was named after when it was completed in 1964.

Basilica

Saint Vincent Parish was founded in 1790. It was the first Catholic parish in Pennsylvania west of the Allegheny Mountains. Father Theodore Brouwers, O.F.M., purchased  of land called "Sportsmen's Hall Tract." A church was built and dedicated on July 19, 1835. It was named after St. Vincent de Paul, whose feast day is July 19 (Roman Calendar, 1737–1969) and September 27.

The cornerstone of the basilica was laid in 1892, and the consecration took place on August 24, 1905. The basilica was completely restored in 1996, as part of the 150th anniversary of the founding of the college.

Traditions
Each year, on the Thursday before Thanksgiving, the Saint Vincent Community celebrates Founders Day, honoring all those who founded the college and have been a part of its community since its inception.  The day features Honors Convocation (held in the Archabbey Basilica), a candle-lit turkey dinner in the gym, Zambelli fireworks and the campus light-up, featuring lighted arches in Melvin Platz where the school's Concert Band performs Christmas themed repertoire.

The Saint Vincent College fight song, "Forward, Saint Vincent," was approved by the college's student government in 1996 and was written by Jen Waldmann, Heather Fields, and Chris Rodkey.  The title, "Forward, Saint Vincent," refers to a quotation from the school's founder, Boniface Wimmer: "Forward, always forward, everywhere forward! We must not be held back by debts, bad years or by difficulties of the times. Man's adversity is God's opportunity." The fight song is performed by The March of the Bearcats Marching Band, along with other pep tunes at both football and basketball games.

Notable alumni
Herbert Boyer
Daniel Santiago
Rembert Weakland
Daniel Hugh Kelly
Erik Wells
Antony Davies
Regis McKenna
Erskine Ramsay
Bill Rosendahl
Adam Maida
René Henry Gracida
John J. Degnan
Douglas Robert Nowicki
Hugh Charles Boyle
George W. Ahr
Mark E. Seremet
Frank E. Resnik
Peter V. Sampo
Richard Burkhauser

See also
 Saint Vincent Seminary
 List of Benedictine Colleges

References

External links
 Official website

 
Catholic universities and colleges in Pennsylvania
Educational institutions established in 1846
Association of Catholic Colleges and Universities
Benedictine colleges and universities
Universities and colleges in Westmoreland County, Pennsylvania
1846 establishments in Pennsylvania
Latrobe, Pennsylvania
Liberal arts colleges in Pennsylvania